Sociedad Polideportiva Castilblanco is a Spanish football team based in Castilblanco, in the autonomous community of Extremadura. Founded in 1999, it plays in Primera Regional de Extremadura, holding home games at Estadio Las Pedreras.

Season to season 

12 seasons in Primera Regional

External links
official blog
fexfutbol.com profile

Football clubs in Extremadura
Divisiones Regionales de Fútbol clubs
Association football clubs established in 1999
1999 establishments in Spain